The 1984 French Open was a tennis tournament that took place on the outdoor clay courts at the Stade Roland Garros in Paris, France. The tournament was held from 28 May until 10 June. It was the 88th staging of the French Open, and the first Grand Slam tennis event of 1984.

The event was part of the 1984 Volvo Grand Prix and 1984 Virginia Slims World Championship Series.

Finals

Men's singles 

 Ivan Lendl defeated  John McEnroe, 3–6, 2–6, 6–4, 7–5, 7–5 
It was Lendl's 1st career Grand Slam title.

Women's singles

 Martina Navratilova defeated  Chris Evert, 6–3, 6–1 
It was Navratilova's 9th career Grand Slam title, and her 2nd (and last) French Open title. She became only the 2nd woman in the open era to hold all four grand slam titles at once, completing the 'Martina Slam'.

Men's doubles

 Henri Leconte /  Yannick Noah defeated  Pavel Složil /  Tomáš Šmíd, 6–4, 2–6, 3–6, 6–3, 6–2

Women's doubles

 Martina Navratilova /  Pam Shriver defeated  Claudia Kohde-Kilsch /  Hana Mandlíková, 5–7, 6–3, 6–2

Mixed doubles

 Anne Smith /  Dick Stockton defeated  Anne Minter /  Laurie Warder, 6–2, 6–4

Prize money

Total prize money for the event was FF14,887,600.

References

External links
 French Open official website